WIN is a television station serving southern New South Wales and the Australian Capital Territory. It is the flagship station of the WIN Television network.

History

Programming
WIN Television broadcasts its programming from Nine Network, includes their regional signals of Nine, 9Gem, 9Go! and 9Life. WIN also broadcasts news, current affairs and sport programs such as Today Extra, Nine News, A Current Affair, Nine's Wide World of Sports, The NRL Sunday Footy Show, Sports Sunday and Today throughout this region.

WIN simulcasts the edition of Nine News from TCN-9 in Sydney.

WIN News
WIN News produces four regional news bulletins for the area markets covered by WIN.

In southern New South Wales, three bulletins for Illawarra & the South Coast, the Riverina and the Central West are produced from newsrooms in Wollongong, Dubbo, Orange, Griffith and Wagga Wagga. Studio presentation for the New South Wales bulletins are recorded from WIN's headquarters in Wollongong with the Canberra bulletin broadcast live.

The New South Wales bulletins are presented by Bruce Roberts and sports presenter Melissa Russell. Bruce Roberts and Melissa Russell also present the Canberra edition.

The head of news in southern New South Wales and the ACT is Stella Lauri.

On 19 June 2019, WIN announced the Axing of the Riverina and Central West news bulletins due to commercial viability, and from then on these areas now broadcast the NSW regional bulletin from Wollongong.

Main transmitters

Television stations in New South Wales
Television stations in Canberra
WIN Television
Television channels and stations established in 1962